George A. Whiting was a vaudeville song and dance man, and also a writer of lyrics for popular songs during the vaudeville era.  He toured with singer Sadie Burt, whom he later married and had 3 daughters with.   His best-known work is "My Blue Heaven", with music by Walter Donaldson. Whiting was born in Chicago August 16, 1884 and died in New York City on December 18, 1943.

References

External links
 George Whiting recordings at the Discography of American Historical Recordings.

1884 births
1943 deaths